Oogamy is a form of anisogamy where the gametes differ in both size and form. 
In oogamy the large female gamete (also known as ovum) is immobile, while the small male gamete (also known as sperm) is mobile. Oogamy is a common form of anisogamy, with almost all animals and land plants being oogamous.

Occurrence 
Oogamy is found in most species that reproduce sexually, all higher species being oogamous.

Oogamy is found in all land plants, and in some red algae, brown algae and green algae. Oogamy is favored in plants because only one gamete has to travel through harsh environments outside the plant. Oogamy is also present in oomycetes.

Almost all animals are oogamous. There are exceptions, such as the opiliones that have immobile sperm.

Etymology 
The term oogamy was first used in the year 1888.

Evolution 

It is generally accepted that isogamy is the ancestral state and that oogamy evolves from isogamy through anisogamy. However, transitions do exist between anisogamy and oogamy.

When oogamy has evolved, males and females typically differ in many aspects. According to David B. Dusenbery internal fertilization probably originated from oogamy. But one study in 2014 on Colemanosphaera said that oogamy in Volvox may have evolved before the transition from external to internal fertilization.

In streptophytes, oogamy likely first occurred before the split between algae and land plants.

See also 
 Gamete
 Anisogamy
 Isogamy

References 

Reproductive system
Germ cells